Sir Peter John Robert Riddell  (born 14 October 1948) is a British journalist and author. He worked for the Financial Times from 1970 to 1991. From April 2016 to September 2021 he served as the British government's Commissioner for Public Appointments, and is the former director of the Institute for Government.

Early and personal life 
Riddell was born in Torquay, Devon on 14 October 1948. His father, a solicitor, served in the RAF during World War II. Riddell lived in Streatham, London during his early life. He attended Dulwich College and graduated from Sidney Sussex College, Cambridge with a BA in history and economics and an MA.

Riddell married Avril in 1994. They have one daughter, born in 1996.

Journalism career 
Riddell joined the Financial Times (FT) in 1970. He was property correspondent in the early 1970s and economics correspondent in the late 1970s, covering events such as the 1976 IMF crisis. He became the FTs political editor in 1981, at the age of 33. He was US editor and Washington bureau chief at the FT between 1989 and 1991, when he left the newspaper. From 1991 to 2010, he was a political commentator for The Times, of which he was also an assistant editor.

Civil society work 
He has been a member of the Hansard Society council since 1996 and was its chair from 2007 until 2012. He was a senior fellow at the Institute for Government from 2008 until 2011, and beginning in January 2012 he was its director.

On 6 July 2010, the Prime Minister, David Cameron, announced that Riddell would be one of three members of an inquiry to determine whether British intelligence officers were complicit in the torture of detainees, including those from the Guantanamo Bay detention camp or subject to rendition flights.

On 20 April 2016, the Cabinet Office announced that Riddell would replace Sir David Normington as the new Commissioner for Public Appointments. His term, which was initially due to expire at the end of April 2021, was extended until the end of September 2021.

Honours 
As part of his work on the torture enquiry, in 2010 Riddell was appointed to the Privy Council to permit easier access to secret information, entitling him to the style "The Right Honourable".

On 25 November 2010, Riddell was awarded the President's Medal by the British Academy "for an outstanding record as the producer of an informed picture of the inner  workings of Whitehall, high politics and the party battle".

Riddell was appointed Commander of the Order of the British Empire (CBE) in the 2012 Birthday Honours for services to journalism and for public service. He was knighted in the 2022 New Year Honours for public service.

Publications 
 The Thatcher Government (1983), 
 The Thatcher Decade (1989), 
 The Thatcher Era and Its Legacy (1991), 
 Honest Opportunism: The Rise of the Career Politician (1993), 
 Parliament Under Pressure (1997), 
 Parliament Under Blair (2000), 
 Blair Government (2002), 
 Hug Them Close: Blair, Clinton, Bush and the 'Special Relationship''' (2004), 
 The Unfulfilled Prime Minister: Tony Blair's Quest for a Legacy (2006), 
 In Defence of Politicians (in Spite of Themselves) (2011), 
 The Power of Judges (2018), 
 15 Minutes of Power: The Uncertain Life of British Ministers'' (2019),

References

External links 
 Institute for Government blog - Peter Riddell's posts
 Hansard Society
 

1948 births
Living people
People educated at Dulwich College
Alumni of Sidney Sussex College, Cambridge
Commanders of the Order of the British Empire
Members of the Privy Council of the United Kingdom
Commissioners for Public Appointments
Recipients of the President's Medal (British Academy)
Financial Times people
The Times people
British male journalists
20th-century British journalists
21st-century British journalists
British newspaper journalists
British political journalists
Writers from London
People from Streatham
Knights Bachelor
Writers from Torquay